Mersin İdmanyurdu (also Mersin İdman Yurdu, Mersin İY, or MİY) Sports Club; located in Mersin, east Mediterranean coast of Turkey in 2004–05. The team participated in Second League Category A for 3rd time in the league's 4th season. Mersin İdmanyurdu football team has finished 2004–05 season in 7th place in Turkish Second League Category A. Mersin idmanyurdu participated in 2004–05 Turkish Cup, and eliminated at second stage.

Hasan Ahi was the president of the club. MİY's formerplayer Levent Arıkdoğan coached the team during the season. Önal Arıca and Selim Özer were the mostly appeared players in the team rosters with 33 appearances each. Season and league top goal scorer was Sedat Debreli (10); and Kerem Zengin, loaned player from Fenerbahçe followed him (9).

2004–05 TFF First League participation
Mersin İdmanyurdu participated in 2004–05 Second League Category A (the league has been played under the name of "Second League Category A" between 2001–02 and 2005–06; "TFF League A" in 2006–07; and "TFF First League" since 2007–08. Also sponsor names have been included in various seasons.). 18 teams attended in the league. Winners, runners-up and second runners-up were directly promoted to 2005–06 Süper Lig. Bottom three teams were relegated to 2005–06 TFF Second League.

Mersin İdmanyurdu participated in 2004–05 Second League Category A and finished 7th.

Results summary
Mersin İdmanyurdu (MİY) 2004–05 Second League Category A season league summary:

Sources: 2004–05 TFF First League pages.

League table
Mersin İdmanyurdu (MİY) 2003–04 Second League Category A season place in league table.

Three points for a win. Rules for classification: 1) points; 2) tie-break; 3) goal difference; 4) number of goals scored. In the score columns first scores belong to MİY.
(C): Champions;  (P): Promoted to 2005–06 Süper Lig;  (R): Relegated to 2005–06 TFF Second League.
Source: 2004–05 TFF First League pages from TFF website, Turkish-Soccer website, and Maçkolik website.

Results by round
Results of games MİY played in 2004–05 Second League Category A by rounds:

First half
Mersin İdmanyurdu (MİY) 2004–05 Second League Category A season first half game reports is shown in the following table. 
Kick off times are in EET and EEST.

Sources: 2004–05 TFF First League pages.

Second half
Mersin İdmanyurdu (MİY) 2004–05 Second League Category A season second half game reports is shown in the following table.
Kick off times are in EET and EEST.

Sources: 2004–05 TFF First League pages.

2004–05 Turkish Cup participation
2003–04 Turkish Cup was played for 43rd time as Fortis Türkiye Kupası for sponsorship purposes. This season Cup was played by 48 teams in one-leg elimination system in 3 elimination rounds prior to quarter-finals. Galatasaray won the cup for the 14th time. Mersin İdmanyurdu participated in the cup at first elimination round and was eliminated in second round.

Cup track
The drawings and results Mersin İdmanyurdu (MİY) followed in 2004–05 Turkish Cup are shown in the following table.

Note: In the above table 'Score' shows For and Against goals whether the match played at home or not.

Game details
Mersin İdmanyurdu (MİY) 2004–05 Turkish Cup game reports is shown in the following table.
Kick off times are in EET and EEST.

Source: 2004–05 Turkish Cup pages.

Management

Club management
Hasan Ahi, a lawyer from an established family native to Mersin was elected the president of the club in the congress held on 24 May 2004.

Coaching team
Levent Arıkdoğan former player of Mersin İdmanyurdu was the head coach during the season.

2004–05 Mersin İdmanyurdu head coach

Note: Only official games were included.

2004–05 squad
Appearances, goals and cards count for 2004–05 Second League Category A and 2004–05 Turkish Cup games. 18 players appeared in each game roster, three to be replaced. Only the players who appeared in game rosters were included and listed in order of appearance.

Sources: TFF club page and maçkolik team page.

See also
 Football in Turkey
 2004–05 TFF First League
 2004–05 Turkish Cup

Notes and references

2004-05
Turkish football clubs 2004–05 season